Grow Games and Toys (Portuguese Grow Jogos e Brinquedos) is a company based in Sao Paulo, Brazil which produces and markets toys and board games. It is widely recognized in the country for both the diversity of its products and for bringing to Brazil some of the greatest classics of both genres.

References

Toy companies of Brazil
Manufacturing companies based in São Paulo
Manufacturing companies established in 1972
Board game publishing companies